The Bloodhound is a 2020 American mystery thriller film written and directed by Patrick Picard, inspired by the Edgar Allan Poe short story "The Fall of the House of Usher." It was to be released at the Emergence Films Festival, but was canceled due to the COVID-19 pandemic. The film was later purchased to be distributed by Arrow Films in the United States, the United Kingdom, Canada, Australia, and New Zealand.

Synopsis 
After being invited to visit a wealthy childhood friend and his twin sister at his home in a remote location, Francis is plagued by strange events.

Cast 
 Liam Aiken as Francis
 Annalise Basso as Vivian
 Joe Adler as Jean Paul Luret
 McNally Sagal as Dr. Ricki
 Kimleigh Smith as Mrs. Hoff
 Gaby Santinelli as Natasha
 Dylan Gentile as pianist

Reception 
On review aggregator website Rotten Tomatoes, the film holds an approval rating of  based on  reviews. Kat Hughes, writing for THN said the film is "atmospheric and unsettling, The Bloodhound is an impressively stylish and intellectual debut that weaves a tangled web of lies, half-truths, and intrigue."

Writing for Variety, Dennis Harvey said that "Patrick Picard’s debut feature is more persuasive as a stylistic exercise than as horror or psychodrama, growing a bit arid even at just 72 terse minutes. But those with an affinity for genre material in a cryptic, ascetic arthouse mode may fall under its chilly spell, and even those who don’t may be curious to see what this writer-director does next."

Zoe Rose Smith, in her review for Zobo With A Shotgun said that "The Bloodhound is perhaps one of the most disconcerting, confusing and bizarre films to grace the screen, but that just adds to the atmosphere and intrigue of it." Joey Keogh, in his analysis for the Vague Visages stated that "even when nothing particularly scary is happening, the sensation that it's about to at any moment is suffocating. Overall, Picard's film is unsettling, tense and incredibly strange."

It was listed by Paste magazine in 2021 as one of the "13 Best Edgar Allan Poe Adaptations".

References

External links 
 

2020 directorial debut films
2020 films
2020 independent films
2020 thriller films
American independent films
American mystery thriller films
Films based on The Fall of the House of Usher
Films postponed due to the COVID-19 pandemic
2020s mystery thriller films
2020s English-language films
2020s American films